The Women's snowboard big air competition at the FIS Freestyle Ski and Snowboarding World Championships 2021 was held on 16 March. A qualification was held on 14 March 2021.

Qualification
The qualification was started on 14 March at 13:30. The eight best snowboarders qualified for the final.

Final
The final was started on 16 March at 13:30.

References

Women's snowboard big air